Lamare Trenton Chansey Bogarde (born 5 January 2004) is a Dutch footballer who plays as a defender or midfielder for EFL League One club Bristol Rovers, on loan from Premier League club Aston Villa. 

He is youth international for the Netherlands, having played at under-15, under-16, and under-18 levels. 
Bogarde started his football career in the Feyenoord academy, before signing on for the Aston Villa academy in 2020.

Early life
Bogarde was born in Rotterdam.

Club career
Bogarde joined Aston Villa from Feyenoord's academy in September 2020. He was named in the Aston Villa starting line-up for his senior debut on 8 January 2021 in an FA Cup third round tie against Liverpool. On 12 January 2021, after impressing in his debut, Bogarde was given his first professional contract at Aston Villa.

On 24 May 2021, Bogarde was part of the Aston Villa U18s team that won the FA Youth Cup, beating Liverpool U18s 2–1 in the final.

On 1 July 2022, Bogarde signed a new, long-term contract with Aston Villa. In the same summer, Bogarde was part of a first team squad for a pre-season tour of Australia.

On 31 January 2023, Bogarde joined EFL League One club Bristol Rovers on loan for the remainder of the season. On 4 February, Bogarde made his English Football League debut as a late substitute in a 2–0 defeat to MK Dons. Following an initially difficult start to his time with the club for the team, Bogarde cemented his place in the team in a central midfield position, impressing manager Joey Barton whom had never watched him play prior to his transfer to the club.

Personal life
Born in the Netherlands, Bogarde is of Surinamese descent. He is the brother of Melayro Bogarde and the nephew of Winston Bogarde, both professional footballers.

Career statistics

Honours 
Aston Villa U18s
 FA Youth Cup: 2020–21

References

2004 births
Living people
Dutch sportspeople of Surinamese descent
Dutch footballers
Association football midfielders
Netherlands youth international footballers
Feyenoord players
Aston Villa F.C. players
Dutch expatriate footballers
Dutch expatriate sportspeople in England
Expatriate footballers in England

Bristol Rovers F.C. players
English Football League players